Spain competed at these games.

The 1998 Games were held in Nagano, Japan.   The Games used the same venues as the Winter Olympics.

References

Nations at the 1998 Winter Paralympics
1998
1998 in Spanish sport